CHRD-FM (105.3 MHz) is a French-language Canadian radio station located in Drummondville, Quebec. It is owned and operated by Bell Media and has a directional antenna with an average effective radiated power of 3,257 watts and a peak effective radiated power of 5,345 watts (class A). The station has specialized in adult contemporary format since August 2009 and is part of the "Rouge FM" network, which operates across Quebec and Eastern Ontario.

It started out as CHRD 1480 kHz and moved to FM in 1997. From about 2001 to 2003, it was part of Astral's CHR network, "Énergie". It became an oldies station in 2003 as part of Astral's new "Boom" network; this format would last until it became "RockDétente" in 2009. All "RockDétente" stations, including CHRD, were rebranded as Rouge FM on August 18, 2011, at 4:00 p.m. EDT. The last song it played under "RockDétente" was "Pour que tu m'aimes encore" by Celine Dion, which was followed by a "RockDétente" tribute. The first song it played as "Rouge" was "I Gotta Feeling" by the Black Eyed Peas.

References

External links
105,3 Rouge
 

Drummondville
Hrd
Hrd
Hrd
Hrd
Radio stations established in 1954
1954 establishments in Quebec